The following is a list of mayors of the city of Ternopil, Ukraine. It includes positions equivalent to mayor, such as chairperson of the city council's executive committee.

Mayors

Austrian Partition 
 Mikołaj Kniaziołucki, 1816–1826) 
 , 1827-1844
 Antoni Dziamski, 1845-1849
 Sylwester Drzemalik, 1850-1853
 Waldemar Mandl, 1855-1868
 Raymond Schmidt, 1868-1972
 Leon Kozminski, 1872-1892
 Bolesław Studziński, 1892-1894
 , 1894-1896
 , 1896-1903
 , 1903-1909
 Stanisław Mandl, 1909–1910, 1912–1915, 1917–1918
 Czesław Trembałowicz, 1910-1912
 , 1915-1917

West Ukrainian People's Republic 
 , 1918-1919

Second Republic 
 , 1920-1926
 , 1926-1927
 , 1928
 Kazimierz Choliński, 1929
 , 1929
 Włodzimierz Lenkiewicz, 1929-1934
 , 1934-1939

Ukraine 
 , 1990-1998
 , 1998-2002
 Bohdan Levkiv, 2002-2006
 , 2006-2010
 Serhiy Nadal, 2010-

See also
 Ternopil history
 History of Ternopil, in Ukrainian

References

This article incorporates information from the Polish Wikipedia and Ukrainian Wikipedia.

External links

 
History of Ternopil Oblast
Ternopil